The Bartow–Pell Mansion is a historic house museum located in the northern portion of Pelham Bay Park in the Bronx, New York City.  A National Historic Landmark, it has one of the nation's finest Greek Revival interiors, and is the last surviving major mid-19th century country estate house in the Pelham Bay area.

History
Originally the Robert and Maria Lorillard Bartow House, the residence and estate date back to 1654. The Lords of the Manor of Pelham once owned the home which was later enlarged, renovated and remodeled in the Federal style. The current house was built between 1836 and 1842. Ownership of the house passed between the Bartow and Pell families until it was finally sold to the City of New York in 1888 by descendants of the Bartow family.

The mansion remained unused and empty for years before being leased by the City of New York to Mrs. Zelia Hoffman in 1914 to house the International Garden Club, Inc., an organization she had founded to promote formal gardens. The club has since extended its purpose to include the preservation and restoration of the home. The exterior of the mansion was restored and the formal gardens were constructed from 1914 to 1917.  In 1936, Mayor Fiorello La Guardia used the mansion as his summer residence while nearby Orchard Beach was built.  The interior of the mansion, furnished with period antiques, reopened to the public as a museum in 1946. Some of the furnishings include the desk of Aaron Burr, who married a distant Bartow relative, Theodosia, and the only original and authentic Lannuier bed. The property also includes the Pell family burial plot.

The property, including the mansion and a carriage house, was made an official New York City designated landmark in 1966 and was designated a National Historic Landmark in 1978. Since 2008, Adventures in Preservation has helped to preserve the Bartow–Pell Mansion, partly funded by a grant from the Cynthia Woods Mitchell Fund for Historic Interiors of the National Trust for Historic Preservation.

References

External links

1842 establishments in New York (state)
Carriage houses in the United States
Carriage houses on the National Register of Historic Places
Historic American Buildings Survey in New York City
Historic house museums in New York City
Houses completed in 1842
Houses in the Bronx
Houses on the National Register of Historic Places in the Bronx
Museums in the Bronx
National Historic Landmarks in New York City
New York City Designated Landmarks in the Bronx
New York City interior landmarks
Pelham Bay Park
Transportation buildings and structures on the National Register of Historic Places in New York City
Pell family